Copley is an English surname. Notable people with the surname include:

Al Copley (born 1952), American jazz pianist
Amber Copley, American beauty queen
Antony Copley (1937–2016), British historian
Dale Copley (born 1991), Australian rugby league player
David C. Copley (1952–2012), American newspaper publisher
Evan Copley, American academic and composer
Sir Godfrey Copley, 2nd Baronet (1653–1709), English landowner
Henri Édouard de Copley, interim Governor of Guadeloupe from 1764 to 1765
Ira Clifton Copley (1864–1947), American publisher and politician
James S. Copley (1916–1973), American publisher and journalist
John Copley (producer) (born 1933), British theatre producer
John Copley (artist) (1875–1950), British artist
John Singleton Copley (1738–1815), Anglo-American portrait painter
John Copley, 1st Baron Lyndhurst (1772–1863), British lawyer and politician
Martin Copley (conservationist) (1940–2014), Australian conservationist
Mary Sibbey Copley (1843–1929), American philanthropist
Michael Copley, British musician
Paul Copley (born 1944), British actor
Phoenix Copley (born 1992), American ice hockey goaltender
Rebecca Copley, American soprano opera singer
Samuel William Copley (1859–1937), English businessman in Australia
Sharlto Copley (born 1973), South African actor
Terence Copley (1946–2011), British author
Teri Copley (born 1961), American actress
William Copley (Queensland politician) (1906–1975), Australian trade union activist
William Copley (South Australian politician) (1845–1925)
William Copley (artist) (1919–1996), American artist